Running with the Wolves is the debut extended play (EP) by Norwegian singer-songwriter Aurora. It was released on 4 May 2015 via Decca and Universal Music.

Composition 
According to Aurora, every song of the EP has a different theme, which she described that there was "a very morbid one, a dreamy one, an animalistic one and then a quite sad one." "Runaway" was released as the lead single of the EP on 7 February 2015 through Petroleum Records. The title track was released as the second and final single of the album. The song has also been adapted to the film Wolfwalkers (2020) produced by Tom Moore. Previous singles "Awakening" and "Under Stars" were included on the vinyl edition of the EP.

Release and promotion 
Running with the Wolves was released on 4 May 2015.

To promote the EP, Aurora did several performances. She performed at the 2015 Nobel Peace Prize Concert. She has played a sold-out headline show in London and supported Of Monsters and Men at Brixton Academy in November 2015. "Runaway" was used at the finale of the third season of the Fox American television psychological thriller series The Following.

Track listings

Notes
 The vinyl version of the EP includes an alternate version of "Awakening" than the single release.

Accolades

Certifications

Personnel 
Credits adapted from the liner notes of the vinyl version of Running with the Wolves.

Musicians 
 Aurora Aksnes – vocals ; piano ; synth 
 Alf Lund Godbolt – synth ; programming 
 Nicolas Rebscher - synth ; keyboards ; programming 
 Odd Martin Skålnes – synth ; piano ; drums & percussion ; programming ; bass guitar ; acoustic guitar 
 Magnus Åserud Skylstad – drums ; piano ; drums & percussion 
 Øystein Skar - synth 
 Pete Davis - keyboards & programming 
 Michelle Leonard - keyboards & programming 
 Edvard Førre Erfjord - programming 
 Henrik Michelsen - programming 
 Matias Monsen - cello 
 Askjell Solstrand - wurlitzer organ 
 Geoff Lawson - conductor (The Royal Philharmonic Orchestra) 
 The Royal Philharmonic Orchestra - orchestra

Technical 
 Aurora Aksnes - production 
 Edvard Førre Erfjord - production, programming & recording 
 Henrik Michelsen - production, programming & recording 
 Magnus Åserud Skylstad - production, programming & recording , mixing 
 Nicolas Rebscher - production & programming 
 Odd Martin Skålnes - production, programming & recording 
 Neil Comber - mixing 
 Alex Wharton - mastering & engineering

Artwork 
 Markus Rakeng - artwork
 Kenny McCracken - photography

Notes

References

External links
 

2015 debut EPs
Albums produced by Magnus Skylstad
Aurora (singer) EPs
Decca Records EPs
Universal Music Group EPs